Novuyo Rosa Tshuma (born 28 January 1988) is a Zimbabwean writer and professor of creative writing. She is the author of Shadows, a novella and House of Stone, a novel.

Biography
Tshuma was born and grew up in Bulawayo, a major city in Zimbabwe. She completed her high-school education at Girls' College, Bulawayo, where she studied mathematics, physics, chemistry and French for her A Levels. She is an alumna of the University of Witwatersrand, where she studied Economics and Finance. In 2009, her short story "You in Paradise" won the Intwasa Short Story Competition (now the Yvonne Vera Award) for short fiction. Tshuma's short stories have been featured in various anthologies, which include The Bed Book of Short Stories (Modjaji Books, 2010); A Life In Full and Other Stories: Caine Prize Anthology 2010 (New Internationalist, 2010) and Where to Now? Short Stories from Zimbabwe (amaBooks, 2011).  Most recently, her short fiction and non-fiction has been featured in McSweeney's, Ploughshares and The Displaced Anthology edited by the Pulitzer prize-winning author Viet Thanh Nguyen. In 2013, she shot to recognition following the release of her collection Shadows, which was published by Kwela Books. Shadows was nominated at the 2014 Etisalat Prize for Literature and also won the Herman Charles Bosman Prize. 

In 2014, Tshuma was listed as part of Africa39, a collaborative project by Hay Festival and Rainbow Book Club recognising 39 of the most promising writers from Africa under the age of 40. She received the Rockefeller Foundation's prestigious Bellagio Center Literary Arts Residency Award for her work in 2017. Tshuma earned her MFA in creative writing from the Iowa Writers’ Workshop and her PhD in literature and creative writing from the University of Houston. She has taught graduate fiction at the Iowa Writers’ Workshop and serves on the Writing, Literature and Publishing Faculty at Emerson College as an assistant professor of fiction.

Tshuma's novel, House of Stone, was longlisted for the 2019 Rathbones Folio Prize and shortlisted for the 2019 Orwell Prize for Political Fiction, the 2020 Balcones Fiction Prize and the 2019 Dylan Thomas Prize. House of Stone won a 2019 Edward Stanford Travel Writing Award in the "Fiction with a sense of place" category and was awarded the 2019 Bulawayo Arts Award for Outstanding Fiction.

Awards 
 2020 Lannan Foundation Literary Fellowship

2020 Balcones Fiction Prize, Shortlist

2019	Edward Stanford Prize for Fiction With a Sense of Place, Winner

2019 Bulawayo Arts Award for Outstanding Fiction, Winner

2019		Orwell Prize for Political Fiction, Shortlist

2019	International Dylan Thomas Prize, Shortlist

2019	Rathbones Folio Prize, Longlist

2017 Rockefeller Foundation Bellagio Arts and Literary Arts Residency

2014	Herman Charles Bosman Prize, Winner

2014 Etisalat Prize for African Literature, Longlist

2009 Yvonne Vera Short Story Award

Selected works
Shadows. A novella published in 2013.
House of Stone. A novel published in the United Kingdom by Atlantic Books in June 2018.

References

External links
 

1988 births
Living people
University of the Witwatersrand alumni
People from Bulawayo
21st-century Zimbabwean writers
21st-century Zimbabwean women writers